Vanmam is a 2014 Indian Tamil-language action drama film directed by Jai Krishna, a former assistant of Kamal Haasan. It stars Vijay Sethupathi, Kreshna and Sunaina. The film has music scored by S. Thaman and cinematography by Balabharani. It is a rural tale about the life of two friends, played by Sethupathi and Kreshna. In spite of expectations the movie didn't perform well at the box office. The film was highly panned by the critics for its poor screenplay.

Cast

 Vijay Sethupathi as Radha
 Kreshna as Chelladurai
 Sunaina as Vadhana
 Madhusudhan Rao as Ratnam
 Bose Venkat as Palraj
 Anjali Rao as Hema
 Sriranjani as Nila
 Vinodhini Vaidyanathan as Palraj's wife
 Radha as Radha's mother
 Radhamani Ammal as Chelladurai's mother
 "Subramaniapuram" Raja as Jai Prakash
 Vazhakku En Muthuraman as Thangappan
 Aroul D. Shankar as Inspector Sakthivel
 "Avan Ivan" Ramraj as Lawyer
 Albert Raj as Sappattai Velu
 Praveen as Kutty
 Subburaj
 S. Iyappan
 V. N. O. Padmanabhan
 Raandilya as Mani

Production
In August 2013, it was confirmed that Vijay Sethupathi would be doing a film with Kreshna titled Vanmam which means "vengeance". Filming began in late April 2014 in Nagercoil. and was shot in and around Kanyakumari district for about 37 days, during which 60% of the filming had been completed. Vijay Sethupathi joined the cast from the second schedule onward. The final schedule began on 15 June 2014 and ended on 10 July 2014. The action sequences were canned during the final schedule of the film. The shooting was wrapped up 3 days earlier on 7 July 2014.

Music

S. Thaman composed the music for the film. The audio launch of the film was scheduled to take place on 28 August 2014, but was postponed to 2 September 2014. The audio rights were purchased by Sony Music India.

The soundtrack received mixed reviews from critics. Behindwoods wrote, "Vanmam - de-ja-vu of Thaman's earlier albums", and rated the album 1.75/5. Indiaglitz wrote, "Thaman's last release Meaghamann is a cool album with just 3 songs and a theme track. He has dished out a similar stuff in Vanmam." Karthik of Milliblog wrote, "But for occasional inventiveness, this familiar, predictable output from Thaman is distressing." Siddarth Srinivas of Cinemalead gave 2 out of 5 and concluded, "Though the autotune tsunami bashes this album to an extent, Thaman has come up with decent songs in "Manamae" and "Aetti Enga Porae". The saturation point has been breached for the composer, and its high time he comes up with innovative music. Otherwise, he better stick to the Telugu industry where he is a celebrated figure!"

Track list

Critical reception
Baradwaj Rangan for The Hindu called Vanmam "just about the vilest thing I've sat through in recent times. The emotional beats are buried so deep they're hardly discernible, and what's on the surface is a generic mix of love and drama and sentiment and action. There's not a thing that's new". The Times of India gave the film 2.5 stars out of 5 and wrote, "The worrying bit about the film is that nothing feels really at stake. The director, who nicely captures milieu, hasn't done so when it comes to characters and plot. The result is that the film often seems like a morality drama turned into a rural masala". Sify wrote, "It is a story that has been told from time immemorial, and there is nothing fresh in presentation or treatment. And terrible screenplay aggravates the misery" going on to call it a "clichéd long and boring movie". Rediff wrote, "Director Jai Krishna's Vanmham is just another ordinary, highly predictable and melodramatic revenge drama that seriously tests your patience".

In contrast, The New Indian Express wrote, "Weaving a fairly engaging tale and moving his narration with focus and assurance, the director establishes his credentials in his very first effort".

References

External links
 
 

2014 films
2010s Tamil-language films
Films scored by Thaman S
2010s masala films
Indian action films
2014 directorial debut films
2014 action films